Hajjiabad-e Nughab (also Romanized as Ḩājjīābād-e Nūghāb; also known as Nūghāb-e Ḩājjīābād (Persian: نوغاب حاجي اباد)) is a village in Mahyar Rural District, in the Central District of Qaen County, South Khorasan Province, Iran. At the 2006 census, its population was 1,023, in 238 families.

References 

Populated places in Qaen County